Bahadur Prasad Singh (born 1 September 1965) is a former Indian middle distance runner. He holds the current  national records in 5000 metres.  Singh set the 5000 m record (13:29.70) in Birmingham, UK on 27 June 1992. Then on 23 December 1995, Prasad clocked a time of 3:38.00 at the 1995 South Asian Games in Chennai to set the 1500 m national record, which stood for 23 years.

Prasad represented India at the 1992 Barcelona Olympics in the 5000 m event where he clocked a time of 13:50.71 in the heats. He also took part in 1500 m at 1996 Atlanta Olympics. He managed an eight position in the fifth heats with an effort of 3:46.16 in the first round. He was awarded the Arjuna award for the year 1992 for his achievements in middle distance running.

References

External links 
 

1965 births
Living people
Athletes (track and field) at the 1992 Summer Olympics
Athletes (track and field) at the 1996 Summer Olympics
Olympic athletes of India
Recipients of the Arjuna Award
Indian male middle-distance runners
Asian Games medalists in athletics (track and field)
People from Mau
People from Mau district
Athletes (track and field) at the 1990 Asian Games
Athletes (track and field) at the 1994 Asian Games
Athletes (track and field) at the 1998 Asian Games
Asian Games bronze medalists for India
Medalists at the 1998 Asian Games